Crash pad may refer to:

 Bouldering mat, a small foam pad used for protection when bouldering
 Punk house, a type of squat popularised by the hippie and punk subcultures
 Crash pad (pilots), a location used by airline flight crews for temporary lodging
 Crash Pad, a 2017 comedy film
The Crash Pad Series, an ongoing queer adult series by Pink and White Productions
A hostel-like setting for airline pilots and flight attendants

See also
 Crash (disambiguation)
 Pad (disambiguation)